The Dalkey Archive is a 1964 novel by the Irish writer Flann O'Brien. It is his fifth and final novel, published two years before his death. It was adapted for the stage by Hugh Leonard in 1965 as The Saints Go Cycling In.

Plot summary
The book features a mad scientist, De Selby, who tries to destroy the world by removing all the oxygen from the air. He has also many strange inventions. He exploits the theory of relativity and invents a kind of time travelling machine, which he uses to age his whiskey, creating brews that have been aged for many decades in just a few hours.

Saint Augustine and James Joyce both have speaking parts in the novel. James Joyce, after forging his own obituary to escape being drafted to fight in the Second World War, was serving pints in a small pub. Saint Augustine, on the other hand, appeared in a magical underwater cave and held a conversation with De Selby. The mad scientist De Selby leads the two main characters, Hackett and Mick, to the cave, to witness this conversation.

Many prominent elements of the book, particularly De Selby himself, the eccentric policemen, and the atomic theory of the bicycle, were taken from O'Brien's much earlier novel The Third Policeman, because he had not been able to find a publisher for it. The latter novel was published posthumously.

References

Further reading

External links
 

1964 novels
Dalkey
Novels by Flann O'Brien
Novels set in Ireland
Novels about time travel
Irish novels adapted into films
MacGibbon & Kee books